The Rain is a 2003 album by the Persian-Indian hybrid ensemble Ghazal, comprising kamancheh player Kayhan Kalhor vocalist and sitar player Shujaat Husain Khan, and tabla player Sandeep Das. The album was nominated for a Grammy Award for Best Traditional World Music Album in 2004.

The album was recorded at a live concert at Radio Studio DRS in Bern on May 28, 2001. Editing, remix, and mastering were completed at Rainbow Studio, Oslo.

Track listing

"Fire" 18:18
"Dawn" 14:58
"Eternity" 19:50

Personnel

Musicians
 Kayhan Kalhor - Kemenche
 Shujaat Husain Khan - Sitar, Vocals
 Sandeep Das - Tabla 

Technical Personnel
 Sascha Kleis – design
 Jan Erik Kongshaug, Kayhan Kalhor, Manfred Eicher - editing, remix, and mastering 
 Andy Mettler - recording engineer
 Gérald Minkoff, Cylla von Tiedemann, Ira Landgarten - photography
 Manfred Eicher - album producer
 Kjell Keller - recording producer

References

External link

ECM Records live albums
Live world music albums
2003 live albums
Live albums by Indian artists
World music albums by Iranian artists
World music albums by Indian artists
Albums produced by Manfred Eicher